Peter Shaw (born June 17, 1966) is an American vocalist and songwriter, having performed with Trans-Siberian Orchestra for four years. He released his debut solo EP, More Alive, in 2013. He is also an American actor appearing in film and television including Hannibal, 100 Centre Street, and Practical Magic.

Filmography

References

External links

https://www.petershawmusic.com/

1966 births
Living people
People from Hancock, Michigan
American male film actors
American male television actors
Male actors from Michigan